The canton of Seignanx is an administrative division of the Landes department, southwestern France. It was created at the French canton reorganisation which came into effect in March 2015. Its seat is in Saint-Martin-de-Seignanx.

It consists of the following communes:
 
Biarrotte
Biaudos
Ondres
Saint-André-de-Seignanx
Saint-Barthélemy
Saint-Laurent-de-Gosse
Saint-Martin-de-Seignanx
Tarnos

References

Cantons of Landes (department)